Transport in Wales is heavily influenced by the country's geography. Wales is predominantly hilly or mountainous, and the main settlements lie on the coasts of north and south Wales, while mid Wales and west Wales are lightly populated. The main transport corridors are east–west routes, many continuing eastwards into England.

Walking

Since 2012, Wales Coast Path in North Wales follows part of the Reading to Holyhead National Cycle Route 5.

Road

The trunk road network carries around one third of road traffic in Wales. Around 80 per cent of traffic on Welsh roads is cars, taxis, and minibuses, mainly on east–west routes in north and south Wales.

South Wales

Wales has 83 miles (133 kilometres) of motorway, all of which are in the south. The major artery is the M4, which enters Wales via the Second Severn Crossing and terminates at Pont Abraham in Carmarthenshire. The M4 in South Wales has 27 junctions and is an important route between the main urban areas in the region. It links Llanelli, Swansea, Neath, Port Talbot, Bridgend, Cardiff and Newport directly to London and the rest of southern England, and indirectly to the Midlands via the A449, A40 and M50.

Following construction of the new bridge, the original Severn Bridge—which crosses the river further upstream at Chepstow—was re-numbered the M48 motorway. Tolls were once collected upon entering Wales using either of the two bridges; these were abolished on 19 December 2018. The A48(M) is a small spur from the M4, from west Newport to east Cardiff.

The second major road is the A470 dual carriageway that connects Cardiff with the South Wales Valleys towns. It suffers from severe congestion especially during peak hours due to significant in-commuting to the Cardiff area.

The A465 Heads of the Valleys road, currently being upgraded to dual carriageway, provides a link between the M4 near Neath across the Heads of the Valleys to Abergavenny, Monmouth and England's West Midlands via the A40 and M50.

North Wales

One of the main arteries for North Wales is the A494, running from Queensferry (near the English border) to Dolgellau. The road begins from the M56 motorway, connecting North Wales with Chester and Manchester Airport, both in England. The more important A55 runs from Holyhead (for ferry connections to Ireland), Conwy, Llandudno Junction and Rhyl to a junction with the M53 motorway near Chester.

One of the oldest roads, the A5 runs from the port of Holyhead south east to Bangor then down through Snowdonia to Betws-y-Coed, Corwen, Llangollen and over the English border south of Chirk. This route has served as the main passage for London-Dublin traffic for many years although its usage has been superseded by the A55 coast road. It is now more famed as a scenic route, and notorious for many Bank Holiday traffic jams.

North–south
Two routes serve as the main north–south links. The A483 begins near Swansea and takes a north-easterly route to Ammanford, Llandeilo, Llandovery, Llanwrtyd Wells, Builth Wells, Llandrindod Wells, Newtown, Welshpool, Oswestry and Wrexham, finally ending at Chester.

The A470 begins in Cardiff Bay and passes through Cardiff, north-to-north-westerly, on to Pontypridd, Abercynon, Merthyr Tydfil, Brecon, Builth Wells, Rhayader, Llangurig, Llanidloes, Llandinam, Commins Coch, Mallwyd, Trawsfynydd, Blaenau Ffestiniog, Dolwyddelan and Betws-y-Coed, terminating at Llandudno. It is a dual carriageway between Cardiff and Merthyr (where it meets the Heads of the Valleys Road, the A465), and the section of this route into Cardiff is heavily used.

Bus and coach network

Bus services are predominantly provided by the council owned Cardiff Bus and Newport Bus in the respective cities. Private sector operators in Wales include:
 Stagecoach South Wales, which provides services on a number of routes centred on Cardiff and the South Wales Valleys, and a low-cost coach service from Cardiff to London as part of its Megabus brand
 First Cymru, which offers services centred on Bridgend, Neath Port Talbot, Swansea, Llanelli, Carmarthen, Haverfordwest and South Pembrokeshire, also providing a key link from Bridgend/Swansea to Cardiff
 Arriva Buses Wales, which provides services through North Wales
 NAT Group, which provides services between East and West Cardiff, and from Central Cardiff to Cardiff Airport, Pontypridd, Barry and Bridgend

In North Wales, National Express offers services from major towns to Liverpool, Manchester, Birmingham, London, Newcastle, Leeds and Bradford.

In South Wales, National Express provides direct services from major towns and cities to Bristol, Gatwick Airport, Heathrow Airport and London Victoria. Services also operate from Cardiff and Newport to Birmingham, Nottingham, Bradford, Sheffield and Hull. Megabus operates services from Cardiff to Bristol, London, Birmingham, Manchester, Leeds and Newcastle.

TrawsCymru is sponsored by the Welsh Government and offers intra-Wales routes, which are:
 Bangor to Aberystwyth via Porthmadog, Dolgellau and Machynlleth;
 Aberystwyth to Cardiff via Aberaeron, Lampeter Carmarthen and Swansea; 
 Aberystwyth to Cardigan via Aberaeron; 
 Wrexham to Barmouth via Llangollen, Bala and Dolgellau;
 Aberystwyth to Cardigan via New Quay; and
 Brecon to Newtown via Builth Wells and Llandrindod Wells.
Fflecsi is a demand-responsive transport service operating across Wales. Operating locally, including in Prestatyn, north-west Pembrokeshire, and Cardiff North, the service is operated in partnership with Transport for Wales, local councils, and local bus operators such as Newport Bus, NAT Group, and Stagecoach South Wales. The service is currently a pilot project, however as part of the Welsh Government's Llwybr Newydd strategy, the service is set to expand across Wales, with services in Blaenau Gwent, Flintshire and Gwynedd launched in 2021.

Traffic pollution
A number of places in Wales suffer from air pollution.

Ports

Milford Haven is the fourth-largest port in the UK in terms of tonnage, and the busiest for oil products. Newport is the busiest UK port for iron and steel, and Port Talbot is the third-busiest for ores. Port Talbot has the deepest berthing facilities in the Severn estuary and is one of only a few harbours in the UK capable of handling Capesize vessels of up to 170,000 tonnes deadweight (DWT) In 2005, the freight tonnage share of Welsh ports was:

 Milford Haven – 63.7%
 Port Talbot – 14.5%
 Holyhead – 7%
 Newport – 6.7%
 Cardiff – 4.2%
 Swansea – 1.2%
 Fishguard – 0.9%
 Barry – 0.8%
 Neath – 0.7%
 Mostyn – 0.3%

Ferries

Welsh ports provide passenger and freight ferry services. In 2005, 3.2 million sea passengers travelled to and from Ireland. Holyhead, the third largest passenger ferry port in the UK, handled over 2.3 million passengers; Fishguard and Milford Haven (Pembroke Dock) handled over 800,000 passengers a year.

The Cardiff Waterbus runs along the River Taff in Cardiff, connecting the city centre with Cardiff Bay and Penarth.

SailRail
Transport for Wales, Iarnród Éireann, as well as Irish Ferries and Stena Line promotes SailRail

From South Wales using West Wales Lines to Fishguard Harbour and on Stena Line to Rosslare Europort service which links with the Iarnród Éireann trains to Dublin Connolly on the Dublin–Rosslare railway line. Whilst from North Wales the North Wales Coast Main Line connects Holyhead with a choice of ferries, either Stena Line or Irish Ferries to Dublin Port, for connecting buses to Dublin Connolly railway station.

Canals
There are canals in Wales.

Rail

History 
Wales' railway network developed in conjunction with that of the rest of the United Kingdom during the nineteenth century. The North Wales Coast Line and South Wales Main Line sought to profit from traffic between London and Ireland. Numerous railways were built to export coal and iron from South Wales and slate from North Wales. In the latter half of the nineteenth century, tourism was booming and railways served resorts such as Llandudno, Barry Island and locations along the Cambrian Coast Line.

The network was rationalised during the twentieth century (particularly by the Beeching cuts), with mainly east–west routes retained. As a result, the rail network within Wales is no longer contiguous. Devolution led to the formation of a single franchise for Wales in 2003. The Wales & Borders franchise, which includes some railway lines in England for completeness, is currently operated by Transport for Wales. As rail usage has grown during the past decades, several freight lines have seen rail services reintroduced, including the Cardiff City Line, the Vale of Glamorgan Line, and the Ebbw Valley Railway.

Current services 
Transport for Wales operate all mainline services wholly within Wales. These range from rural lines such as the Welsh Marches Line to the Cardiff commuter lines, and long-distance routes between North and South Wales, via Chester, Wrexham General and Shrewsbury. They also operate services from Wales to Manchester, Crewe, Birmingham and Gloucester. Services to London are operated by Greater Western Railway (from South Wales) and Avanti West Coast (from North Wales). Great Western Railway also operate services from Cardiff to Portsmouth via Bristol, Bath and Southampton, and CrossCountry operate services from Cardiff to Nottingham.

The bulk of rail transport in Wales today is concentrated in the south, with Cardiff Central, Cardiff Queen Street, Newport, Swansea and Cardiff Bay being the busiest stations. Most passengers travel on east–west routes. In 2018–2019, there were 33.5 million rail passenger journeys which either started or ended in Wales, including 24.0 million journeys within Wales. Cardiff was the destination for almost 44 per cent of these journeys. In the north, the bulk of rail travel is concentrated around Wrexham General and the Llandudno Junction to Chester section. The South Wales Main Line is being electrified as far as Cardiff Central. Owing to the closure of the line between Swansea and Aberystwyth, and the absence of other north–south routes, it is very problematic to travel from Swansea to Caernarfon by rail.

There are regional metro bus and rail improvement programmes in South East Wales, South West Wales, and North Wales, with the latter including proposals for an extension of a railway line from Bangor down to meet the Cambrian Coast line.

Urban rail

The only form of commuter rail system in Wales is the Valley Lines network serving Cardiff and the South Wales valleys, serving 20 stations in Cardiff and 61 stations in the surrounding area. Train frequency at the core of the network is up to every 5 minutes.

Cable transport

Llandudno Cable Car operates a cable car to the Great Orme summit.

Tram

The only surviving first generation tram service within Wales is the Great Orme Tramway, a cable-hauled tramway in Llandudno which survives as a tourist attraction.

Cardiff, Swansea and Newport had extensive tram systems until the mid-20th century. Plans were mooted in the late 1990s for a modern tram system to serve Cardiff's urban areas, but these were shelved due to the costs of building and maintaining such a system.

The world's first passenger tram service was the Mumbles Railway in Swansea, initially horse-drawn but later operated by steam and electric trams.

The Llandudno and Colwyn Bay tramway, demolished in 1956, has a preservation society which has restored some original carriages.

During the announcement of upgrades to the Welsh Valley Lines, a new South Wales Metro system was put into construction which consists of Rapid Transit lines serving Barry Island, Rhoose, Newport, Rhymney and Coryton. This also includes multiple tram lines through Cardiff and the surrounding commuter towns partially running on abandoned railway lines, existing railway lines and a small portion of street running to Cardiff Bay, and Roath Lock which passes the Senedd Welsh Parliament Building. The first 4 of these lines will open in 2023, with 3 other lines planned by 2026. The trams will service Aberdare, Treherbert, Radyr, Caerphilly, Merthyr Tydfil, Pontypridd, and Cardiff City Centre as well as the cities' suburbs.

Heritage railways
Wales has a large number of heritage railways. Some of these were former industrial narrow gauge railways, such as the Corris Railway. Others were formed from portions disused standard gauge railways, either kept as standard gauge (e.g. Barry Tourist Railway) or converted to narrow gauge (e.g. Brecon Mountain Railway). Some of the narrow gauge heritage railways are marketed as the Great Little Trains of Wales.

Notable heritage railways include:
The Talyllyn Railway, the first railway in the world to be saved by a preservation society
The Snowdon Mountain Railway, the only rack and pinion railway in the United Kingdom
The Ffestiniog Railway, the oldest surviving railway company in the world
The Welsh Highland Railway, linking the Ffestiniog Railway at Porthmadog to Caernarfon
The Gwili Railway, the first standard gauge preserved railway to operate in Wales
The Vale of Rheidol Railway, the last steam railway owned by British Rail until 1989

Proposed North South Railway 

A railway route linking North and South Wales has been proposed.

Cycling 

According to the National Survey for Wales 2017–18, almost 2% of the Welsh population cycled daily for active travel purposes. In total, 6% of the population actively travelled by bicycle at least once a week. Welsh Government data suggests that cycling in Wales is male-dominated; 12% of men said they cycle at least once per month for active travel purposes in 2017, compared to only 6% of women.

In Wales, the Active Travel (Wales) Act was passed in 2013 which requires ministers and Welsh local authorities to 'map' active travel routes and networks across the country. It also requires Welsh Ministers to "report on active transport in Wales".

In 2018, Cardiff City Council announced plans to develop a Cycle Superhighway network, similar to the network which exists in London. The project has since been rebranded, and five new Cycleways have been proposed in the city. The scheme is due to be completed over a fifteen-year period and is aimed at promoting active travel by bicycle in the city. The first five routes are due to open at the end of the first phase of the project in 2021.

Despite Cardiff's Cycleways scheme, Flintshire is Wales' top local authority for active travel by bicycle; in the National Survey for Wales 2017–18, almost 18% of respondents in Flintshire said that they travel at least once per month by bicycle, compared to just over 16% of respondents in Cardiff. Fewer than 4% of the respondents in Carmarthenshire, Newport, Denbighshire and Blaenau Gwent said that they actively travel by bicycle at least once per month.

Sustrans maintains several routes in Wales which form part of the National Cycle Network. Major ones include National Cycle Route 8 which runs from Cardiff to Holyhead and National Cycle Route 47 which is also known as the Celtic Trail.

Airports
Wales has one airport offering scheduled services  -Cardiff.

In South Wales the air travel market is estimated to be in the region of 3.5 million passengers, half of whom are served by Cardiff Airport while the remainder travels mainly to Heathrow, Bristol and Gatwick. Over three-quarters of passengers passing through Cardiff Airport are from international flights, and the remainder are domestic passengers mainly travelling between Cardiff and Belfast, Edinburgh, Newcastle, Glasgow or Jersey. The North Wales air passenger market is small and Manchester, Liverpool and Birmingham airports provide the main access.

An air service with a flight time of around one hour between Cardiff Airport and Anglesey Airport started in May 2007, with two return flights a day, and attracted 40,000 passengers over the first 2½ years.  It was originally run by Highland Airways but, after that company's closure, was taken over on a temporary basis by Isle of Man-based company Manx2 (now Citywing) in 2010. The service is now operated by Eastern Airways.
The service ceased operations in June 2022.

Cardiff Airport is the sole airport in Wales for air freight, and is ranked 19th in the UK in terms of freight movement. However, Airbus flies out some of the aircraft wings produced in its Broughton plant.

See also
Cycling in Cardiff
List of railway stations in Wales
Transport in the United Kingdom
Traws Link Cymru

References

External links
Traveline Cymru
Wales Air Network